Mount Thompson is a mountain,  high, standing north-west of Lehrke Inlet and surmounting the central part of the base of Eielson Peninsula, on the east coast of Palmer Land. It was discovered by the Ronne Antarctic Research Expedition, 1947–48, under Finn Ronne, who named this feature for Andrew A. Thompson, geophysicist with the expedition.

References
 

Mountains of Palmer Land